Mohammad Hussein Musa Zureiqat ((born 8 September 1991), commonly known as Mohammad Abu Zureiq, is a Jordanian footballer who plays as a defender for Al-Faisaly.

References

External links
 jo.gitsport.net
 

1991 births
Living people
Jordanian Muslims
Jordanian footballers
Jordan international footballers
Jordanian expatriate footballers
Association football defenders
Al-Faisaly SC players
Al-Ramtha SC players
Al-Arabi (Jordan) players
Al-Hussein SC (Irbid) players
Mansheyat Bani Hasan players
Hidd SCC players
Al-Orouba SC players
Najran SC players
Muaither SC players
Al-Thoqbah Club players
Al-Nahda Club (Saudi Arabia) players
Saudi First Division League players
Qatari Second Division players
Expatriate footballers in Oman
Expatriate footballers in Saudi Arabia
Expatriate footballers in Bahrain
Expatriate footballers in Qatar
Jordanian expatriate sportspeople in Bahrain
Jordanian expatriate sportspeople in Saudi Arabia
Jordanian expatriate sportspeople in Oman